Aruba participated in the 2015 Parapan American Games.

Competitors
The following table lists Aruba's delegation per sport and gender.

Athletics

Men

See also
 Aruba at the 2015 Pan American Games

References

Nations at the 2015 Parapan American Games
2015 in Aruba
Aruba at the Pan American Games